Admiral of the Fleet Michael Cecil Boyce, Baron Boyce,  (2 April 1943 – 6 November 2022) was a British Royal Navy officer who also sat as a crossbench member of the House of Lords until his death in November 2022.

Boyce commanded three submarines and then a frigate before achieving higher command in the Navy and serving as First Sea Lord and Chief of the Naval Staff from 1998 to 2001 and then as Chief of the Defence Staff from 2001 to 2003. As Chief of Defence Staff he is believed to have had concerns about US plans for a national missile defence system. In early 2003 he advised the British Government on the deployment of troops for the invasion of Iraq, seeking assurances as to the legitimacy of the deployment before it was allowed to proceed.

Early life
Michael Cecil Boyce, the first son of Commander Hugh Boyce DSC and his Afrikaner wife, Madeline (née Manley), was born in Cape Town on 2 April 1943. His two brothers were Philip Boyce, a professor of psychiatry in Australia, and Graham Boyce, a diplomat.

Naval career

Boyce was educated at Hurstpierpoint College and the Royal Naval College, Dartmouth. He completed the Submarine Command Course in 1973, became commanding officer of the submarine  in the same year and, having been promoted to lieutenant commander on 8 January 1974, was given command of the submarine  later that year.

Promoted to the rank of commander on 30 June 1976, Boyce became commanding officer of the submarine  in 1979. He was posted to the Directorate of Naval Plans at the Ministry of Defence in 1981 and appointed an Officer of the Order of the British Empire (OBE) in the 1982 Birthday Honours, before being promoted to captain on 30 June 1982. He was given command of the frigate  in January 1983, and returned to the Ministry of Defence as captain, Submarine Sea Training in 1984. He attended the Royal College of Defence Studies in 1988 and then became Senior Naval Officer in the Middle East in 1989. He went on to be Director of Naval Staff Duties at the Ministry of Defence in August 1989. Following promotion to rear admiral, he became Flag Officer Sea Training in July 1991. He became Flag Officer, Surface Flotilla and NATO Commander of the Anti-Submarine Warfare Striking Force in November 1992.

Promoted to vice admiral in February 1994, Boyce was appointed a Knight Commander of the Order of the Bath in the 1995 New Year Honours. He was promoted to full admiral on 25 May 1995, on appointment as Second Sea Lord and Commander-in-Chief Naval Home Command, and went on to be Commander-in-Chief Fleet as well as NATO Commander-in-Chief Eastern Atlantic and NATO Commander Allied Naval Forces North West Europe in September 1997.

Boyce became First Sea Lord and Chief of Naval Staff in October 1998 and was advanced to Knight Grand Cross of the Order of the Bath in the 1999 Birthday Honours. He was appointed Chief of the Defence Staff in February 2001, and in that role is believed to have had concerns about US plans for a national missile defence system. In early 2003 he advised the British Government on the deployment of troops for the invasion of Iraq, seeking assurances as to the legitimacy of the deployment before it was allowed to proceed. He was appointed a Knight of Justice of the Most Venerable Order of the Hospital of Saint John of Jerusalem on 27 November 2002, and retired as Chief of Defence Staff on 7 November 2003.

Later career

Boyce was created a life peer as Baron Boyce, of Pimlico in the City of Westminster, on 16 June 2003 and was appointed a Deputy Lieutenant of Greater London on 19 December 2003. He was also appointed a non-executive director of WS Atkins plc in May 2004 and Lord Warden of the Cinque Ports on 10 December 2004, succeeding Queen Elizabeth the Queen Mother in that role. He became chairman of the Royal Navy Club of 1765 & 1785 (United 1889) in 2004.

In May 2005, Boyce was among the several retired Chiefs of Defence Staff who spoke in the House of Lords about the risk to servicemen facing liability for their actions – for which he claims politicians are ultimately responsible – before the International Criminal Court. He gave evidence to The Iraq Inquiry on 3 December 2009. He was created a Knight Companion of the Order of the Garter in April 2011 and was a member of the Top Level Group of UK Parliamentarians for Multilateral Nuclear Disarmament and Non-proliferation.

Boyce was Patron of the Submariners Association, Dover College, the Dover War Memorial Project and of Kent Search and Rescue as well as being an Elder Brother of Trinity House and Chairman of the Royal National Lifeboat Institution. He took a keen interest in sports. In 2013, he was elected Master of the Drapers' Company. He has been the president of the Pilgrims Society, the Royal Navy Submarine Museum and Hastings charity, the Winkle Club, as well as a trustee of the Naval and Military Club.

Boyce was appointed an honorary admiral of the fleet in the Queen's 2014 Birthday Honours.

On 6 December 2021, Boyce was appointed Vice-Admiral of the United Kingdom.

Personal life and death
In 1971, Boyce married Harriette Gail Fletcher, with whom he had one son and one daughter. Following the dissolution of his first marriage, he married Fleur Margaret Anne Rutherford (née Smith). Lady Boyce died in 2016 at the age of 67. 

Boyce died from cancer on 6 November 2022, at the age of 79.

Honours

Arms

References

External links 
 

|-

|-

|-

|-

|-

|-

1943 births
2022 deaths
First Sea Lords and Chiefs of the Naval Staff
Royal Navy admirals of the fleet
Royal Navy submarine commanders
Deputy Lieutenants of Greater London
Crossbench life peers
Lords Warden of the Cinque Ports
People educated at Hurstpierpoint College
Knights of the Garter
Graduates of the Royal College of Defence Studies
Knights Grand Cross of the Order of the Bath
Officers of the Order of the British Empire
People from Cape Town
Chiefs of the Defence Staff (United Kingdom)
Commanders of the Legion of Merit
Knights of Justice of the Order of St John
Members of Trinity House
Life peers created by Elizabeth II